Tom P. Hanafan is the former mayor of Council Bluffs, Iowa and is a past president of the Iowa League of Cities.

Education
Hanafan graduated from Thomas Jefferson High School. While in high school, he played football and baseball and worked a number of different jobs including delivering newspapers, cleaning windows and cleaning an ice cream truck. After graduating high school, he received a scholarship to football at the University of South Dakota. During the summer, he would go back home to work for his dad at the Union Pacific Railroad in Omaha.

Family
Hanafan is the son of Robert and Evelyn Hanafan. He has two sisters, Nancy and Barbara, and a younger brother, Mike. In 1969, he married his wife Shirley.

References

Living people
Mayors of places in Iowa
Year of birth missing (living people)